Yaroslav Mykhaylovych Hodzyur (born 6 March 1985) is a footballer who plays as a goalkeeper. He has dual citizenship of Ukraine and Russia.

Club career
On 4 February 2022, Hodzyur extended his contract with Ural Yekaterinburg to June 2023. On 1 March 2022, the contract was terminated by mutual consent following the Russian invasion of Ukraine.

Career statistics

References

External links
 
 
 
  Player page on the official FC Terek Grozny website Translated version
 

1985 births
Sportspeople from Ivano-Frankivsk
Living people
Ukrainian footballers
Russian footballers
Association football goalkeepers
FC Chornohora Ivano-Frankivsk players
FC Hazovyk-Skala Stryi players
PFC Krylia Sovetov Samara players
FC Dynamo-2 Kyiv players
FC Akhmat Grozny players
FC Ural Yekaterinburg players
Ukrainian First League players
Ukrainian Second League players
Russian Premier League players
Ukrainian expatriate footballers
Expatriate footballers in Russia
Ukrainian expatriate sportspeople in Russia